Kalahrod cave  or Ghar-e-Chah-e-Vazmeh is a cave in Iran, situated in Isfahan Province at an elevation of 1450 meters above sea level. It is 33 kilometers north of the village Kalahrod or approximately 80 kilometers north of Isfahan. Near the cave there is a limestone well, that is 16 meters deep and 3 meters wide which has become a refuge habitat for rock pigeons.

See also
List of caves in Iran
Geography of Iran
Tourism in Iran
Iranian architecture

References

Archaeological sites in Iran
Caves of Iran
Landforms of Isfahan Province
Tourist attractions in Isfahan Province